Kevin Can F**k Himself is an American dark comedy television series created by Valerie Armstrong, who also serves as an executive producer.

The first two episodes were made available on AMC+ on June 13, 2021, and the series premiered on AMC on June 20, 2021. In August 2021, the series was renewed for a second season. In November 2021, AMC confirmed the series would end after two seasons. The second and final season premiered on August 22, 2022, on AMC and AMC+.

Plot
Set in Worcester, Massachusetts, the show explores the life of Allison McRoberts, a woman struggling to redefine her life amid an unhappy marriage to her husband Kevin, an insensitive, unambitious man-child. The show presents contrasting perspectives of her experience: as a stereotypical sitcom wife when Allison is with her husband Kevin, shown with a multiple-camera setup and canned laughter, and as a woman navigating a difficult personal path, filmed in the single-camera setup more common to television dramas.

Cast and characters

Main
 Annie Murphy as Allison Devine McRoberts, a woman seeking to take the lead in her own life.
 Mary Hollis Inboden as Patricia "Patty" Deirdre O'Connor, the McRoberts' neighbor who owns a beauty parlor.
 Eric Petersen as Kevin McRoberts, an insensitive and unambitious man-child man who is Allison's husband—modeled on the loutish husbands in sitcoms such as The King of Queens, The Honeymooners, and, most pointedly, Kevin Can Wait, the CBS sitcom starring Kevin James. He is completely oblivious to Allison's life and activities when she is away from him.
 Alex Bonifer as Neil O'Connor, Kevin's friend and Patty's brother who often gets involved in his schemes. Neil is extremely dimwitted. Like Kevin, he is completely oblivious to Patty's life away from him.
 Brian Howe as Peter "Pete" McRoberts, Kevin's father. He predominantly makes caustic comments on the goings on in the "sitcom" portions of the show and often gets involved in his son's activities.
 Raymond Lee as Samuel "Sam" Park, Allison's old friend from high school who now owns a diner and is married. He and Allison still have feelings for each other.
 Candice Coke as Detective Tammy Ridgeway (main season 2; recurring season 1), a detective investigating illegal oxycodone distribution; she enters into a relationship with Patty in Season 1.

Recurring
 Jamie Denbo as Diane McAntee, Allison's aunt and co-worker who runs a liquor store; starts sleeping with Neil in Season 2.
 Meghan Leathers as Jenn (season 1; guest season 2), Sam's wife
 Robin Lord Taylor as Nick (season 1; guest season 2), a restaurant worker who is out on parole
 Sean Clements as Kurt (season 1), Patty's boyfriend
 Lauren Weedman as Lorraine (season 2), Pete's girlfriend who annoys Kevin

Guest
 Jon Glaser as Paddy
 Brian Scalabrine as himself
 Sean Avery as himself
 Peri Gilpin as Donna, Allison's mother
 Rachel Dratch as Beatrice, a former employee at City Hall
 Erinn Hayes as Molly, Kevin's new girlfriend

Episodes
Each episode is released on AMC+ one week prior to the AMC broadcast date.

Season 1 (2021)

Season 2 (2022)

Production

Development
In November 2018, it was announced AMC had opened a writers' room on the series as part of its scripts-to-series development model, with Valerie Armstrong serving as creator and executive producer, with Rashida Jones and Will McCormack serving as executive producers under their Le Train Train banner. In October 2019, AMC ordered the series.

The show's title is an allusion to Kevin Can Wait, a 2016 CBS sitcom starring Kevin James, which was heavily criticized for the manner in which the lead character's wife (played by Erinn Hayes) was written out of the show in the second season. Although Kevin Can F**k Himself is not meant as a direct parody of Kevin Can Wait, that incident served as a jumping-off point for the creators of Kevin Can F**k Himself to make a show exploring the implications of gender roles in American family sitcoms. On August 27, 2021, AMC renewed the series for a second season. On November 30, 2021, AMC confirmed the series would conclude after two seasons.

Casting
In February 2020, Annie Murphy joined the series' cast in the leading role. In March 2020, Eric Petersen, Mary Hollis Inboden and Alex Bonifer joined the cast in starring roles. In May 2020, Raymond Lee and Brian Howe also joined the cast in starring roles. In January 2021, Meghan Leathers and Candice Coke joined the cast in recurring roles.

In May 2022, Erinn Hayes was cast in a guest role.

Reception

Critical reception
The first season of Kevin Can F**k Himself holds an 82% approval rating on review aggregator website Rotten Tomatoes, based on 60 reviews with an average rating of 6.80/10. The website's critical consensus reads, "Kevin Can F**k Himself ambitious blend of genres don't always gel, but searing social commentary and a stellar performance from Annie Murphy make for an engaging watch." On Metacritic, the first season holds a rating of 65 out of 100, based on 25 critics, indicating "generally favorable reviews".

On Rotten Tomatoes, the second season holds an approval rating of 100% with an average rating of 7.7/10 based on 6 reviews.

Accolades
The first season episode "Live Free or Die" won the American Cinema Editors Award for Best Edited Multi-Camera Comedy Series, with "Fixed" and "The Grand Victorian" also nominated. The series was recognized with The ReFrame Stamp for hiring people of underrepresented gender identities, and of color.

Footnotes

References

External links
 
 

2020s American black comedy television series
2021 American television series debuts
2022 American television series endings
AMC (TV channel) original programming
English-language television shows
Metafictional television series
Television series about marriage
Television shows set in Massachusetts
Works about misogyny